The men's lightweight double sculls competition at the 1996 Summer Olympics in Georgia, USA took place at Lake Lanier.

Competition format
This was the first time this event was a part of the Olympic rowing regatta.

This rowing event is a double scull event, meaning that each boat is propelled by a pair of rowers. The "scull" portion means that the rower uses two oars, one on each side of the boat; this contrasts with sweep rowing in which each rower has one oar and rows on only one side. As a lightweight rowing competition, the body mass of the rowers was limited to a maximum of 72.5 kilograms each and 70 kilograms on average.

The competition consisted of multiple rounds. Finals were held to determine the placing of each boat; these finals were given letters with those nearer to the beginning of the alphabet meaning a better ranking. Semifinals were named based on which finals they fed, with each semifinal having two possible finals.

With 19 boats in heats, the best boats qualify directly for the semi-finals. All other boats progress to the repechage round, which offers a second chance to qualify for the semi-finals. Unsuccessful boats from the repechage must proceed to final C, which determines places 13-18. The best three boats in each of the two semi-finals qualify for final A, which determines places 1–6 (including the medals). Unsuccessful boats from semi-finals A/B go forward to final B, which determines places 7–12.

Results

Heats
The winner of each heat advanced to the semifinals, remainder goes to the repechage.

Heat 1

Heat 2

Heat 3

Heat 4

Repechage
The first 2 boats in each repechage qualified for semi-finals 1/2 and the rest for semi-finals 3/4

Repechage 1

Repechage 2

Repechage 3

Repechage 4

Semifinals
In the first 2 Semi-finals, the first three places advance to Final A, the remainder to Final B.
In 3rd and 4th Semi-finals, the last place finisher was eliminated and the remaining boats advanced to Final C.

Semifinal 1

Semifinal 2

Semifinal 3

Semifinal 4

Finals

Final C

Final B

Final A

References

External links
Official Report of the 1996 Atlanta Summer Olympics
 	

Rowing at the 1996 Summer Olympics
Men's events at the 1996 Summer Olympics